Bryony Frost (born 13 April 1995) is an English National Hunt jockey from Buckfastleigh, Devon. In 2019 she became the first female jockey to win a Grade 1 race at the Cheltenham Festival.

Background 
Frost comes from a racing family. Her father, Jimmy Frost, is a trainer and former jockey who rode the winner of the 1989 Grand National, Little Polveir. Her grandfather, Richard Frost, was also a trainer. Her brother, Hadden Frost, is a former jockey who won numerous races including the Pertemps Final at the Cheltenham Festival on Buena Vista in 2010. Frost learnt to ride on a donkey, before winning multiple Devon and Cornwall pony racing championships.

Career 
After competing in point-to-points, Frost had her first ride under rules, as an amateur, in February 2013. Two years later she had her first win under rules, riding Current Event, trained by Rose Loxton, at Musselburgh. In 2016 she started to ride for trainer Paul Nicholls. Still riding as an amateur jockey, Frost won the Foxhunter Chase at the 2017 Cheltenham Festival, riding Pacha Du Polder, trained by Nicholls. She turned professional in July 2017 and later that month secured her first win as a conditional jockey on the Nicholls-trained Black Corton at Worcester. The novice chaser provided Frost with a further six victories. These included her first Grade 1 race, when the pair won the Kauto Star Novices’ Chase at Kempton on Boxing Day 2017 and Frost became only the second British female jockey to win a top-class race over obstacles.

In December 2017, Frost had her first ride on the Nicholls-trained Frodon, coming second in the listed Ascot Silver Cup. It was the start of a successful partnership, with the pair winning the Grade 3 Crest Nicholson Handicap Chase at Cheltenham in January 2018. Frost had her first Grand National ride in April 2018, coming fifth on the 25/1 chance Milansbar, trained by Neil King.

In November 2018, Frost rode the Nicholls-trained Present Man to win the Badger Beers Silver Trophy at Wincanton, repeating their victory of the previous year Later that month she rode out her claim, becoming only the fifth British based female jockey to achieve 75 wins over jumps. The 2018/19 season saw Frost resume her successful partnership with Frodon, with victories in the Grade 2 Old Roan Chase at Aintree, the Grade 3 Caspian Caviar Gold Cup and the Grade 2 Cotswold Chase, both at Cheltenham. In March 2019 the pair won the Ryanair Chase and Frost became the first woman to win a Grade 1 race at the Cheltenham Festival. The following day Rachael Blackmore won the Albert Bartlett Novices' Hurdle. She finished the season on 49 winners and in April 2019 was awarded the British conditional jockeys title.

In 2019, Frost was one of eight nominees in the BT Sport's Action Woman Of The Year Awards and one of six nominees in the Sunday Times Sportswoman of The Year Awards.

The 2019/20 season saw a further victory for Frost and Frodon when they won the Grade 2 Silviniaco Conti Chase in January 2020 at Kempton. Frodon was beaten into fourth place in the Ryanair Chase at the 2020 Cheltenham Festival.

In December 2020, Frost rode Frodon to victory in the King George VI Chase at Kempton, becoming the first female jockey to win the race. Her win gave Frodon's trainer, Paul Nicholls, a twelfth win in the race. It was her 175th career win, making her the all-time leading female National Hunt jump jockey in Britain.

In February 2021, Frost rode Secret Investor to win the Grade 2 Denman Chase at Newbury, defeating the two-time King George VI Chase winner horse, Clan Des Obeaux. In April 2021, Frost rode a big-race double at Sandown, winning the Grade 2 Oaksey Chase on Frodon and the Grade 1 Celebration Chase on Greaneteen, also trained by Nicholls.

The 2021/22 began with two more Grade 1 successes for Frost, with Frodon winning the Ladbrokes Champion Chase at Down Royal in Ireland in October and Greaneteen winning the Tingle Creek Chase at Sandown in December.

BHA investigation

In September 2020, Frost lodged a complaint with the British Horseracing Authority (BHA) about bullying and harassment by jockey Robbie Dunne. The BHA opened an investigation in April 2021. In December 2021, the BHA announced that an independent panel had upheld the allegations against Dunne after hearing evidence from Frost, Dunne, and a number of other jockeys. Dunne was banned for 18 months, reduced to 10 months on appeal.

Cheltenham Festival winners (2)
 Foxhunter Chase - (1)  Pacha Du Polder - (2017)
 Ryanair Chase - (1) Frodon - (2019)

Major wins
 Great Britain
 King George VI Chase - (1) Frodon (2020)
 Celebration Chase - (1) Greaneteen (2021)
 Tingle Creek Chase - (1) Greaneteen (2021)
 Ireland
 Ladbrokes Champion Chase - (1) Frodon (2021)

References

External links 

 Official website

1995 births
English jockeys
Living people
People from Buckfastleigh
British female jockeys